The Dr. Henry Wheeler House is a property in Grand Forks, North Dakota, United States, that was listed on the National Register of Historic Places in 1986. It was built in 1884 or 1885. It was probably designed by George Wheeler, a New York architect, younger brother of Henry. It includes Italianate architecture. The property includes just one contributing building, the house. Also included is one non-contributing building, a more modern garage. The listing is described in its NRHP nomination document.

It's a red brick building that stands out in its neighborhood near the Red River of the North.

References

Houses in Grand Forks, North Dakota
Houses completed in 1884
Houses on the National Register of Historic Places in North Dakota
Italianate architecture in North Dakota
National Register of Historic Places in Grand Forks, North Dakota
1880s establishments in Dakota Territory